Kamiichikawa No.2 Dam is a rockfill dam located in Toyama prefecture in Japan. The dam is used for flood control and power production. The catchment area of the dam is 38.7 km2. The dam impounds about 39  ha of land when full and can store 7800 thousand cubic meters of water. The construction of the dam was started on 1971 and completed in 1985.

References

Dams in Toyama Prefecture
1985 establishments in Japan